Devyn Dalton is a Canadian actress, stuntwoman, dancer and voice over artist.

Career
Devyn has starred in Nickelodeon's A Fairly Odd Christmas as Christmas Carol and  Escape from Mr. Lemoncello's Library as Gretel. In War for the Planet of the Apes, she played Cornelius, having played Cornelia (Cornelius's mother) in Rise of the Planet of the Apes.

Devyn has also been recognized for her role as Púca in the hit series Legends of Tomorrow. She has performed stunts in numerous TV and film productions, some of which are, The BFG (Steven Spielberg), The Predator (Shane Black), Percy Jackson (Thor Freudenthal), Skyscraper (Rawson Marshall Thurber), X-Men: Dark Phoenix (Simon Kinberg), Once Upon a Time and Legion.

Devyn is a voice over actor on My Little Pony: Friendship Is Magic, Season 8 and 9, voicing the role of Ocellus. She also does the English dubbing for the hit anime series Beyblade Burst, voicing the role of Shasa Guten. Devyn is strongly recognized for her expertise as a motion capture performer. She is also a professional dancer training from a young age in various styles such as hip hop, jazz, ballet, contemporary, salsa and musical theatre.

Filmography

References

External links

Living people
Canadian film actresses
Canadian television actresses
Motion capture actresses
Year of birth missing (living people)